Dangerous Millions is a 1946 American drama film directed by James Tinling and written by Irving Cummings Jr. and Robert G. North. The film stars Kent Taylor, Dona Drake, Tala Birell, Leonard Strong, Rex Evans and Robert Barrat. The film was released on November 27, 1946, by 20th Century Fox.

Plot

Combat pilot turned soldier of fortune Jack Clark is summoned to Shanghai with other potential heirs to seek a fortune left by Hendrick Van Boyden a decade before.

Cast   
Kent Taylor as Jack Clark
Dona Drake as Elena Valdez
Tala Birell as Sonia Bardos
Leonard Strong as Bandit Chieftain
Rex Evans as Lance Warburton
Robert Barrat as Hendrick Van Boyden 
Konstantin Shayne as Prof. Jan Schuyler
Otto Reichow as Nils Otter
Rudolph Anders as Rudolph Busch
Franco Corsaro as Alfredo Charles
Henry Rowland as Leo Turkan
Victor Sen Yung as Lin Chow

References

External links 
 

1946 films
20th Century Fox films
American drama films
1946 drama films
Films directed by James Tinling
American black-and-white films
1940s English-language films
1940s American films